Flowers in the Sand (2011), the second novel by South African author Clive Algar,
has been described by literary critics as "completely engrossing and superbly written" and "a great adventure story".

Writing in Independent Online, critic Lloyd Mackenzie says: "By blending the richness of his own
fictional characters with one of South Africa’s most historic events, he has created an enticing
journey of a woman trying to survive against all odds … it is completely engrossing and superbly
written. I am definitely going to look out for more of this author’s work."

Novelist and critic Jeanette Ferreira, writing in Beeld, says: "The Anglo-Boer War (1899-1902)
remains a popular source for fiction. And, as with all historical novels, the challenge is to write
about people’s destinies without yielding to the temptation to force all that hard-won research
material into the text or to write a military report. Clive Algar undoubtedly understands this art.

"Although all his historical figures become people of flesh and blood – especially Jan Smuts – his
book is mainly the story of Emma Richardson … who, during the siege of O'okiep, must struggle with
moral dilemmas about which she has never even had to think before, let alone handle successfully.

"... Emma is not destined to bloom or wither in this sandveld forever. But if I said where her path
leads I would be giving away a thrilling story."

Writing in The Citizen, Dries Brunt says: "The siege of O’okiep, a mining town in Namaqualand,
the people living there under the threat of a Boer conquest, a dangerous mission to seek relief, a
woman’s courage and a final outcome that is honourable, make this a great adventure story."

Plot introduction

Trapped by tragic circumstances in a dusty Namaqualand mining town during the Anglo-Boer War,
Emma Richardson must degrade herself in order to survive. Then the town is besieged by Boer
fighters, led by their tortured commandant Manie Smit, and Emma is faced with a fateful choice.
With her vision of the ephemeral desert flowers in her mind, she sets out alone on foot by night on a
desperate mission to create a new future for herself.

External links
Independent Online
Beeld
The Citizen
Clive Algar's official website

2011 novels
Historical novels
21st-century South African novels
Novels set in South Africa
Namaqualand
Fiction set in 1902
Second Boer War books